William "Hambone Willie" Newbern (probably 1901 – April 15, 1965) was an American guitar-playing country blues musician.

Life and career
Few details are known of his life.  He is believed to have been born in Haywood County, Tennessee, close to Brownsville along Tennessee State Route 19. He was reported to have played with Yank Rachell and Sleepy John Estes (from whom most of our knowledge of Hambone was gained) in the 1920s and 1930s.  He recorded one of the earliest known versions of the blues standard "Rollin' and Tumblin'", which was waxed in Atlanta, Georgia in 1929. He only recorded six tracks in total, which also included, "She Could Toodle-Oo" and "Hambone Willie's Dreamy-Eyed Woman's Blues."

Newbern was reputedly a hot-tempered man, but reports that he was beaten to death in a prison brawl, around 1947, are disputed by researchers Bob Eagle and Eric LeBlanc who assert that he died at home in Memphis, Tennessee, in 1965.

References

External links
 Illustrated Hambone Willie Newbern discography

1965 deaths
African-American guitarists
American blues guitarists
American male guitarists
American blues singers
Country blues musicians
Deaths by beating in the United States
20th-century American guitarists
People from Haywood County, Tennessee
People from Memphis, Tennessee
20th-century African-American male singers